The Party's Over is an album by hardcore punk band Murphy's Law. It was released in 2001 on Artemis Records. Reflex/Wolfpack Records released the European vinyl pressing of the album in 2002.

The title of the album is a reference to New York City's music scene at the turn of the century.

Production
The album was produced by Daniel Rey.

Critical reception
AllMusic called the album "15 tracks of blistering, rowdy, and fast club punk, something that diehard fans should truly savor." Billboard wrote that singer Jimmy G "displays a wider range and a sense of melody only hinted at on past albums."

Track listing
"Maximum Lie" - 2:31
"Vicky Crown" - 2:53
"Stressed Out" - 1:37
"Hypocrite" - 1:27
"Bitch" - 1:39
"Redemption Time" - 1:53
"Mission" - 2:53
"Walking Alone" - 2:20
"Wasting My Time" - 2:19
"C-Low" - 2:30
"Faith" - 1:53
"Skinhead Girl" - 3:15
"Know Loyalty" - 2:21
"Exile" - 2:12
"Woke Up Tied Up" - 3:06

References

2001 albums
Murphy's Law (band) albums
Albums produced by Daniel Rey